Peter Toh (born September 21, 1981) is an American musician, songwriter, record producer and singer. From New York, he started writing and producing songs before he was in high school. He toured the US with The Stryder, releasing two albums on Equal Vision Records. He then went on to produce and release two solo EPs independently, titled Cleopatra and Shoes of A Beast.
 
Toh appeared on Lil Mama's Voice of the Young People (Familiar Faces/Jive) as an artist/writer/producer, with the song "Truly in Love", and was also a featured artist on Queens rapper Yak Ballz album, Scifentology II, on the song "A Billion Ways". He is the co-founder of the internet video company Hidden Track TV, and in late 2009, Toh started a new band called Planes. Planes has recorded their debut album, Mountainside, which was released on December 30, 2010.

Discography

Albums
 Cleopatra (Elkion Records – 2004)
 Shoes of a Beast (Hidden Track Music Group – 2006)

Appears on
2008: "A Billion Ways" from the album Scifentology II by Yak Ballz
2008: "Truly in Love" from the album Voice of the Young People by Lil Mama

References

External links
 Peter Toh's Home Page
 Peter Toh's Myspace Page
 Hidden Track TV

American male pop singers
American male musicians
Musicians from New York City
Living people
1981 births
People from Roslyn, New York
Record producers from New York (state)
Songwriters from New York (state)
American male songwriters